The 2009 Abilene Christian Wildcats football team was an American football team that represented Abilene Christian University (ACU) as a member of the Lone Star Conference (LSC) during the 2009 NCAA Division II football season. In their fifth season under head coach Chris Thomsen, the Wildcats compiled an 9–4 record (6–3 against conference opponents). They were selected to the Division II playoffs, where they defeated Midwestern State, 24–21 in the first round, before they were defeated by Northwest Missouri State in the second round, 35–10.

The team played its home games at Shotwell Stadium in Abilene, Texas.

Schedule

References

Abilene Christian
Abilene Christian Wildcats football seasons
Abilene Christian Wildcats football